Perigrapha mundoides is a species of moth of the family Noctuidae. It is endemic to Israel, Lebanon and Jordan.

Adults are on wing from February to March. There is one generation per year. The larvae likely feed on crown of thorns (Paliurus spina-christi) and other related shrubs.

External links
 Hadeninae of Israel

Hadeninae
Endemic fauna of the Middle East
Moths described in 1940
Moths of the Middle East